The United States Virgin Islands competed at the 14th Pan American Games held in Santo Domingo, Dominican Republic from August 1 to August 17, 2003.

Results by event

Swimming

Men's Competition

Women's Competition

See also
 2002 Central American and Caribbean Games
 Virgin Islands at the 2004 Summer Olympics

Nations at the 2003 Pan American Games
P
2003